Nocturne is an album by jazz musician Charlie Haden, released through Universal/Polygram in 2001. In 2002, the album won Haden the Grammy Award for Best Latin Jazz Album.

Reception 

Music critic David R. Alder of Allmusic called the album a "melancholy, soothing album" but also wrote "the unvaryingly straightforward arrangements fade too easily into the background. Nocturne may well be the best candlelight dinner music ever, but Haden and his guests are capable of more."

Track listing 
 "En la Orilla del Mundo (At the Edge of the World)" (Martín Rojas) – 5:14
 "Noche de Ronda (Night of Wandering)" (María Teresa Lara) – 5:43
 "Nocturnal" (José Saber Marroquín, José Mojica) – 6:56
 "Moonlight (Claro de Luna)" (Haden) – 5:37
 "Yo Sin Ti (Me Without You)" (Arturo Castro) – 6:02
 "No Te Empeñes Mas (Don't Try Anymore)" (Marta Valdés) – 5:30
 "Transparence" (Gonzalo Rubalcaba) – 6:11
 "El Ciego (The Blind)" (Armando Manzanero) – 5:58
 "Nightfall" (Haden) – 6:40
 "Tres Palabras (Three Words)" (Osvaldo Farrés) – 6:18
 "Contigo en la Distancia/En Nosotros (With You in the Distance/In Us)" (Cesar Portillo De La Luz, Tania Castellanos) – 6:33

Personnel 
 Charlie Haden - Bass
 Gonzalo Rubalcaba - Piano
 Ignacio Berroa - Drums
 Joe Lovano - Tenor Saxophone  (tracks 1,4,7 & 11)
 David Sanchez - Tenor Saxophone (tracks 6 & 10)
 Pat Metheny -  Guitar (track 2)
 Federico Britos Ruiz - Violin (tracks 1,5 & 8)

References 

2001 albums
Charlie Haden albums
Grammy Award for Best Latin Jazz Album